Saddleback Mountain (or just Saddleback) is the name of a number of mountains worldwide.  It can also describe any mountain, hill or ridge having a concave outline at the top.

Mountains called Saddleback include:

United States
By state (shown with USGS ID numbers)
 Saddleback Mountain, part of McDowell Mountains, Arizona
 Saddleback Butte (California), 248515
 Saddleback Mountain (Los Angeles County, California), 1765039
 Saddleback (Orange County, California)
 Saddleback Mountain (San Bernardino County, California), 248517
 Saddleback Mountain (Sierra County, California), 265713 
 Saddleback Mountain (Clear Creek County, Colorado), 182070	
 Saddleback Mountain (Conejos County, Colorado), 192922
 The Saddleback (York County, Maine), 576914
 The Saddleback (Oxford County, Maine), 576915
 Saddleback Junior, 574662
 Saddleback Mountain (Carthage, Maine), 574666
 Saddleback Mountain (Hancock County, Maine), 574667
 Saddleback Mountain (Rangeley, Maine), 574668
 Saddleback Mountain (Aroostook County, Maine), 574669
 Saddleback Mountain (Piscataquis County, Maine), 574670
 Mount Greylock, Massachusetts, known earlier as Saddleback Mountain
 Saddleback Hill, a mountain in Dukes County, Massachusetts
 Saddleback Butte (Montana), 776071
 Saddleback Mountain (Stillwater County, Montana), 789897
 Saddleback Mountain (Beaverhead County, Montana), 789898
 Saddleback Mountain (New Hampshire), 869672
 Saddleback Mountain (New Mexico), 910512
 Saddleback Mountain (Lewis, Essex County, New York), 963211
 Saddleback Mountain (Keene, New York), 970556
 Saddleback Mountain (Bandera County, Texas), 1345828
 Saddleback Mountain (Uvalde County, Texas), 1367106
 Saddleback Mountain (Vermont), 1459305
 Saddleback Mountain (Virginia), 1473684
 Saddleback Mountain (Laramie County, Wyoming), 1593743
 Saddleback Mountain (Converse County, Wyoming), 1602671

Other countries
 Saddleback Mountain (New South Wales), Australia
 The Saddleback (Alberta), Banff National Park, Alberta, Canada
 Blencathra, also known as Saddleback, a mountain in Cumbria, England

See also
Saddleback (disambiguation)

Saddleback Mountain